Lola Granola, also known as Fatima Struggle, is a fictional character in the comic strips Bloom County and Opus by Berkeley Breathed.

Lola, a free spirited hippie and abstract artist, is the unlikely fiancée of Opus the Penguin. Their polar opposite personalities clash almost immediately; Opus dislikes her art, abhors her vegetarianism, and is horrified to learn that she has a tattoo of Dan Fogelberg in a "scandalous" place. (Opus mispronounces the name, calling him 'Dan Fogerburp.') He also once shows up to meet her mother and pastor while dressed in his costume for his heavy metal band Deathtöngue. Lola grudgingly shaves her legs because Opus gets rugburn when they dance, which causes her "Dead Head" membership to be revoked.

After a long-awaited wedding, Opus is knocked out when his nose collides with Lola's when they kiss. While unconscious, Opus dreams about Lola leaving him 20 years later with 23 tube-grown kids. Opus demands annulment on grounds of having incompatible noses and Lola is spoiled from all birds for the rest of her life (Tweety Bird later tries to ask her out, but she refuses).

As Bloom County's final strips, Opus meets with her once more, at which point she reveals that she wants to pose in Playboy.

She did not appear in Outland; however, Lola made her first appearance in Opus on August 12, 2007. On August 26, 2007, it is implied that she is Steve Dallas' girlfriend.

The August 26, 2007 and September 2, 2007 Opus comic strips featuring Lola Granola were withheld from newspapers across America after The Washington Post deemed the comic strips as being too controversial. In the August 26 strip, Lola tells Steve Dallas that she has become a "radical Islamist", which is the "hot new fad on the planet," and that she prefers to be called "Fatima Struggle." She then insinuates at the end of the strip that Steve will not get any sex, "God willing." The September 2 strip has Steve telling Lola to wear a yellow polka-dot bikini, but instead she appears at the end of the comic strip wearing a Burqini.

The Christmas 2017 run of the renewed Bloom County, beginning with the December 21st strip, finds Steve receiving a summons to the hospital room of a despondent Lola after an apparent attempted suicide. The janitor Frank brings Lola, Steve and an aged patient, Mrs Dumont, to the Canadian wilderness in a helicopter to see the Northern Lights.

References

Granola, Lola
Granola, Lola
Comics characters introduced in 1986